Vaihingen may refer to:

Vaihingen (Stuttgart), a city district of Stuttgart
Vaihingen an der Enz, a town in the district of Ludwigsburg in Baden-Württemberg

See also 
 Vaihinger